Cirrina or Cirrata is a suborder and one of the two main divisions of octopuses. Cirrate octopuses have a small, internal shell and two fins on their head, while their sister suborder Incirrina has neither. The fins of cirrate octopods are associated with a unique cartilage-like shell in a shell sac. In cross-section, the fins have distinct proximal and distal regions, both of which are covered by a thin surface sheath of muscle.

The suborder is named for small, cilia-like strands (cirri) on the arms of the octopus, a pair for each sucker.  These are thought to play some role in feeding, perhaps by creating currents of water that help bring food closer to the beak. Cirrate octopuses are noteworthy for lacking ink sacs.

Phylogeny

A molecular phylogeny based on mitochondrial and nuclear DNA marker sequences by 
Sanchez et al., 2018, shows that the Cirrina is paraphyletic, i.e. it is not a single clade. Instead, a clade containing Opisthoteuthidae and Cirroctopodidae is sister to the Octopodida, while a clade containing Cirroteuthidae and Stauroteuthidae is sister to the clade that contains those other groups. However subsequent studies, using a greater coverage of species and genes, have found Cirrata and Incirrata to be monophyletic clades, consistent with earlier morphological and molecular studies.

Classification
CLASS CEPHALOPODA
Subclass Nautiloidea: nautilus
Subclass †Ammonoidea: ammonites
Subclass Coleoidea
Superorder Decapodiformes: squid, cuttlefish
Superorder Octopodiformes
Family †Trachyteuthididae (incertae sedis)
Order Vampyromorphida: vampire squid
Order Octopoda
Genus †Keuppia (incertae sedis)
Genus †Palaeoctopus (incertae sedis)
Genus †Paleocirroteuthis (incertae sedis)
Genus †Proteroctopus (incertae sedis)
Genus †Styletoctopus (incertae sedis)
Suborder Cirrina: finned deep-sea octopus
Family Opisthoteuthidae: umbrella octopus
Family Cirroteuthidae
Family Stauroteuthidae
Family Cirroctopodidae
Suborder Incirrina

References

External links
Cirrata at the Tree of Life Web Project
Cirrate male reproductive tract at the Tree of Life Web Project

Octopuses
Paraphyletic groups